The Roman Catholic Diocese of Santo Tomé, is located in the city of Santo Tomé, in the province of Santa Fe, Argentina.

History
On 3 July 1979, Blessed John Paul II established the Diocese of Santo Tomé from the Archdiocese of Corrientes and the Diocese of Goya.

Ordinaries
Carlos Esteban Cremata (1979–1985) 
Alfonso Delgado Evers (1986–1994), appointed Bishop of Posadas
Francisco Polti Santillán (1994–2006), appointed Bishop of Santiago del Estero
Hugo Norberto Santiago (2006–2016), appointed Bishop of San Nicolás de los Arroyos)
Gustavo Alejandro Montini (2016- )

References

Roman Catholic dioceses in Argentina
Roman Catholic Ecclesiastical Province of Corrientes
Christian organizations established in 1979
Roman Catholic dioceses and prelatures established in the 20th century